Semitic most commonly refers to the Semitic languages, a name used since the 1770s to refer to the language family currently present in West Asia, North and East Africa, and Malta. 

Semitic may also refer to:

Religions
 Abrahamic religions
 Semitic religions (disambiguation)
 Ancient Semitic religion

Other linguistic terms
 Proto-Semitic language
 Semitic root
 Semitic studies

People
 Semitic people, an obsolete term for an ethnic, cultural or racial group who speak or spoke the Semitic languages
 Ancient Semitic-speaking peoples

See also
 Semitism (disambiguation)
 Shem

Language and nationality disambiguation pages